Over the Rainbow is a Canadian reality talent competition, which premiered on CBC Television on September 16, 2012. Based on the 2010 series Over the Rainbow in the United Kingdom, the series auditioned aspiring musical theatre performers for the role of Dorothy for a Toronto production of Andrew Lloyd Webber's stage musical adaptation of The Wizard of Oz. The series was hosted by Daryn Jones. Arlene Phillips, Thom Allison, and Louise Pitre served as judges alongside Webber.

The competition began with a Dorothy "boot camp" run by Lloyd Webber, which trained contestants and eliminated all but 10 finalists. Following a public telephone vote on 4 November 2012, 20-year-old Danielle Wade was chosen as Dorothy to perform the role for Mirvish Productions in Toronto, which started on 20 December 2012. Wade has played several leading roles in student and community theatre and is an acting major at the University of Windsor. The judges praised her as "a consistently solid performer with a big voice and girl-next-door likeability and charm".

The show also auditioned Canadian dogs for the part of Toto. CBC and Weber did not restrict the breed of Toto to Cairn Terrier (as used in the 1939 film), but instead searched for a dog that embodies the spirit of Toto: One that is a "bright fun loving companion full of energy and charisma". The winner was a small mixed breed dog named Linzy, that looks similar to the film's Toto, owned by Reta Thompson. However, Linzy did not appear in the stage production.

Finalists
Ten contestants made it through the audition rounds and performed during the live shows.

* at the start of the series

Results summary

Live shows
The live shows saw the finalists eliminated one by one following both individual and group performances. At the end of every live show, the losing Dorothy would have her shoes stripped by the Dorothy who survived the sing-off, and the shoes would be given to Lloyd Webber (week 1) and Phillips (weeks 2-7).

Week 1
Following the first week of the competition. The show performances were:

Group performances:
"Follow the Yellow Brick Road" (from the musical The Wizard of Oz)
"One" (from the musical A Chorus Line)

Sing-off:
Kelsey Verzotti and Julia Gartha were in the sing-off, and performed "What I Did for Love" from the musical A Chorus Line.
Andrew Lloyd Webber chose to save Julia and send Kelsey home.

Week 2
The show performances were:

Group performances:
"Ding-Dong! The Witch Is Dead" (from the musical The Wizard of Oz)
"Defying Gravity" (from the musical Wicked)

Sing-off:
Jessie Munro and Michelle Bouey were in the sing-off, and performed "Another Suitcase in Another Hall" from the musical Evita.
Arlene Phillips chose to save Jessie and send Michelle home.

Week 3
The show performances were:

Group performances:
"The Merry Old Land of Oz" (from the musical The Wizard of Oz)
"Anything You Can Do" (from the musical Annie Get Your Gun)

Sing-off:
Jessie Munro and Julia Gartha were in the sing-off, and performed "As Long as He Needs Me" from the musical Oliver!.
Arlene Phillips chose to save Jessie and send Julia home.

Week 4
The show performances were:

Group performances:
"If I Only Had a Part" (from the musical The Wizard of Oz)
"I Enjoy Being a Girl" (from the musical Flower Drum Song)

Sing-off:
Jennifer Gillis and Stephanie La Rochelle were in the sing-off, and performed "Tell Me on a Sunday" from the musical Tell Me on a Sunday.
Arlene Phillips chose to save Stephanie and send Jennifer home.

Week 5
The show performances were:

Group performances:
"Don't Rain on My Parade" (from the musical Funny Girl)
"Mamma Mia! Medley" with Louise Pitre

Sing-off:
Jessie Munro and Cassandra Hodgins were in the sing-off, and performed "Tell Me It's Not True" from the musical Blood Brothers.
Arlene Phillips chose to save Cassandra and send Jessie home.

Week 6
The show performances were:

Group performances:
"Together (Wherever We Go)" (from the musical Gypsy)
"You Can't Stop the Beat" (from the musical Hairspray)
"The Trolley Song" (from the musical Meet Me in St. Louis) with Thom Allison

Sing-off:
Stephanie La Rochelle and Cassandra Hodgins were in the sing-off, and performed "On My Own" from the musical Les Misérables.
Arlene Phillips chose to save Stephanie and send Cassandra home.

Week 7
The show performances were:

Group performances:
"Don't Stop Believin'" (from the musical Rock of Ages)
"Seasons of Love" (from the musical Rent)
"Something's Coming" (from the musical West Side Story)

Sing-off:
Colleen Furlan and AJ Bridel were in the sing-off, and performed "No Matter What" from the musical Whistle Down the Wind.
Arlene Phillips chose to save AJ and send Colleen home.

Week 8
For their individual performances, the contestants sang songs by Andrew Lloyd Webber.

The show performances were:

Group performances:
"The Wizard of Oz Medley"
"Already Home" (from the musical The Wizard of Oz)
"Sing" (by Gary Barlow & The Commonwealth Band featuring Military Wives)

References

External links
 Official Program Website at cbc.ca

CBC Television original programming
2010s Canadian reality television series
2012 Canadian television series debuts
2012 Canadian television series endings
Music competitions in Canada
Singing talent shows
Television series about teenagers
Television series by Temple Street Productions